Naranjo is a canton in the Alajuela province of Costa Rica. The head city is located in the homonymous Naranjo district.

Toponymy 
It is named for the citrus plantations found in the area.

History 
Naranjo was created on 9 March 1886 by decree 9.

Geography 
Naranjo has an area of  km² and a mean elevation of  metres.

The Grande River forms the western and southern boundaries of the canton. The Espino River is on the north, and the Colorado and Molino rivers establish the eastern border.

Districts 
The canton of Naranjo is subdivided into the following districts:
 Naranjo
 San Miguel
 San José
 Cirrí Sur
 San Jerónimo
 San Juan
 El Rosario
 Palmitos

Demographics 

For the 2011 census, Naranjo had a population of  inhabitants.

Transportation

Road transportation 
The canton is covered by the following road routes:

References 

Cantons of Alajuela Province
Populated places in Alajuela Province